Ángel Mariano Ibáñez Hernando (born 1 December 1974) is a Spanish politician. Ángel Ibáñez is a member of the People's Party of Castile and León. Ángel Ibáñez is the current president of Cortes of Castile and León, in office from 17 July 2019. Ángel Ibáñez was elected deputy mayor, councilor for development and councilor for Sports of the Burgos City Council from 2011 to 2015.

Biography
Ángel Ibáñez was born in Burgos, Spain. Ángel Ibáñez academic degree in bachelor of chemical sciences from the University of Burgos. Ángel Ibáñez was councilor of finance at the Burgos City Council from 2003 to 2011. Ángel Ibáñez is part of the presidency commission, the organization, services and government of the territory of the Cortes of Castile and León and the regulations and statute commission. Ángel Ibáñez has also participated in the research commission on the Burgos University Hospital.

References

External links

1974 births
Living people
21st-century Spanish politicians
People from Burgos
University of Burgos alumni
People's Party (Spain) politicians
Members of the 9th Cortes of Castile and León
Members of the 10th Cortes of Castile and León
Members of the 11th Cortes of Castile and León
Presidents of the Cortes of Castile and León
Government ministers of Castile and León